Events in the year 2017 in Tanzania.

Incumbents
 President: John Magufuli
 Vice-President: Samia Suluhu 
 Prime Minister: Kassim Majaliwa 
 Chief Justice: Mohamed Chande Othman (until 18 January), Ibrahim Hamis Juma (starting 18 January)

Events

Deaths

4 January – Anna Senkoro, politician and medical doctor (b. 1962).

12 June – Vinod Chohan, scientist (b. 1949)

References

 
2010s in Tanzania
Years of the 21st century in Tanzania
Tanzania
Tanzania